David Lindsay (29 June 1919 – 19 April 1987) was a Scottish professional footballer who played as a full-back for Sunderland. He died in East Kilbride, Lanarkshire in April 1987 at the age of 67.

References

1919 births
1987 deaths
Association football fullbacks
Blantyre Victoria F.C. players
English Football League players
Scottish footballers
Southend United F.C. players
Sportspeople from Cambuslang
Sunderland A.F.C. players
Yeovil Town F.C. players
Footballers from South Lanarkshire